John of Artois (29 August 1321 – 1387), called "sans Terre" (Lackland), was the son of Robert III of Artois and Joan of Valois. The confiscation of his father's goods for attempted fraud in 1331 had left him without an inheritance.

In 1352, he was created Count of Eu by King John II of France, a title earlier forfeited at the execution of the previous holder, Raoul II of Brienne. He was badly wounded at the Battle of Poitiers on 19 September 1356, and was captured there by the English. Enormously rich his ransom was sold to the Edward the Black Prince by his captor Élie de Pommiers for 30,000 gold écus.

He married Isabeau of Melun (1328–1389), daughter of John I of Melun, Count of Tancarville, on 11 July 1352 and had the following issue:
 Joan (1353–1420), married at the Château d'Eu on 12 July 1365 Simon de Thouars (d. 1365), Count of Dreux
 John of Artois (1355–1363), Lord of Peronne
 Robert IV of Artois, Count of Eu (1356–1387)
 Philip of Artois, Count of Eu (1357–1397)
 Charles (1359 – 15 April 1368)
 Isabeau (1361 – 26 June 1379)

Genealogy

Notes

References

1321 births
1387 deaths
Counts of Eu
John
French prisoners of war in the Hundred Years' War
Younger sons of earls